Sorin Cătălin Frunză (born 29 March 1978) is a Romanian professional footballer who plays as a left midfielder for Liga IV side Avântul Valea Mărului.

Frunză began his career at Dunărea Galați. After one year spent at Cimentul Fieni and Politehnica Timişoara and two one-year spells at Dacia Unirea Brăila and Jiul Petroşani, Frunză moved in 2002 to newly founded Vaslui, and spent two seasons at the club before a transfer to Universitatea Craiova in the Romanian first division. However, following a dispute between Vaslui and Craiova over $50,000 that the former was to receive from the latter, Frunză returned to Vaslui after only six months. He was appointed team captain and helped Vaslui to gain a historical promotion in Divizia A, after only three years since the club foundation.

On 30 March 2008, Frunză alongside team-mates Silviu Bălace and Daniel Sabou were accused by Adrian Porumboiu of fixing a match against Steaua București. As a consequence, he was relegated to Vaslui's second team and subsequently sold to Unirea Urziceni. He won the first and only league championship of his career with the Wolves, as part of the squad that conquered the season's Liga I title. In 2010, as a result of Unirea Urziceni's decline, Frunză was released and subsequently moved to Rapid București. He returned one year later at his youth club Oțelul Galați, but he failed to make an impact. In 2012, he returned for a second spell at Dacia Unirea Brăila in the Romanian second tier.

Career
Frunză started his professional career at Oțelul Galați. He moved after that at Cimentul Fieni, Politehnica Timişoara and Jiul Petroşani, before he signed for FC Vaslui, when the team was in the 3rd Division. He managed to win the promotion with Vaslui and became the team captain because of his good display.

Universitatea Craiova
In the 2004–05 summer, he was loaned to U Craiova, but he stayed there only half of season, after that he returned at Vaslui, where he succeeded promotion for the first time in history club, in Liga I.

FC Vaslui
He played only half of the season at FC Vaslui in the 2005–06 season, an injury causing him troubles for playing in that season. In the next season, he played only two matches, because a conflict with the coach Viorel Hizo, and in the second part of the season, he was loaned to FC Botoşani.

He returned in the next season, where he was chosen vice-captain from the team, after Bogdan Panait. Because of his good performance, he was named captain of the team, and he was one of the best assisters from the Championship. He scored two goals in the FC Vaslui 2–1 victory against the champions, FC Dinamo București, and he scored one of the most beautiful goals from the Romanian Championship history, against Universitatea Craiova, recovering in his own half, and after dribbling three players, he shot with his right foot, right to the bottom corner.
At the end of the season he was sold to Unirea Urziceni, for almost 200.000 $.

Unirea Urziceni
Frunză quickly established himself as a key member in Dan Petrescu's team and helped the side to its first championship title in history in the 2008–09 season. Frunză was a starter in all six Champions League matches for Unirea as the team finished third with eight points, behind FC Sevilla and Vfb Stuttgart, but ahead of Rangers. On 6 March 2010, Frunză was named best player of Unirea in the derby against Steaua Bucharest after scoring once and providing an assist for team-mate Marius Onofras.

Rapid București
After Unirea disbanded, Frunză joined FC Rapid București, but failed to impress and ended his contract after only one season.

Oțelul Galați
In July 2012, Frunză signed up for Oţelul Galaţi on a one-year-contract. He was on the bench for the Romanian Supercup, game won by Oțelul against FC Steaua București. At the end of his contract, in June 2012, he was released by Oțelul.

Dacia Unirea Brăila
After he was released by Oțelul, Sorin Frunză signed up for Dacia Unirea Brăila the fierce rivals of Oţelul Galaţi. He quickly established himself as a key member of the team.

Honours 
Unirea Urziceni
 Liga I: 2008–09

CSU Galați
 Liga IV – Galați County: 2018–19
 Cupa României – Galați County: 2018–19

Statistics 
Statistics accurate as of match played 9 December 2017

References

External links
 
 
 

1978 births
Living people
Sportspeople from Galați
Romanian footballers
Association football midfielders
Liga I players
Liga II players
FCM Dunărea Galați players
FC Politehnica Timișoara players
AFC Dacia Unirea Brăila players
CSM Jiul Petroșani players
FC Vaslui players
FC U Craiova 1948 players
FC Botoșani players
FC Unirea Urziceni players
FC Rapid București players
ASC Oțelul Galați players